Sunderbach may refer to:

Sunderbach (Trüggelbach), a river of North Rhine-Westphalia, Germany, tributary of the Trüggelbach
Sunderbach (Else), a river of North Rhine-Westphalia, Germany, tributary of that Else which is tributary of the Werre